Murom (Old Norse: Moramar) is a historical city in Vladimir Oblast, Russia, which sprawls along the left bank of the Oka River. Population:

History
In the 9th century AD, the city marked the easternmost settlement of the East Slavs in the land of the Finnic Muromians. The Primary Chronicle mentions it as early as AD 862. It is thus one of the oldest cities in Russia. Circa 900 AD, it was an important trading post from Volga Bulgaria to the Baltic Sea.

Between AD 1010 and AD 1393, it was the capital of a separate principality, whose rulers included Saint Gleb, assassinated in AD 1015 and canonized in AD 1071, Saint Prince Konstantin the Blessed, and Saints Peter and Fevronia of Murom, subjects of an opera by Rimsky-Korsakov. It was believed to be the home town of the most celebrated East Slavic epic hero, Ilya Muromets. The town has a statue which shows Ilya holding the hilt of his sword in the left hand and a cross in the right.

On June 30, 1961, Murom was the site of a spontaneous protest and riot against the police and Soviet authorities, following the death in police custody of a senior factory foreman named Kostikov.

Administrative and municipal status
Within the framework of administrative divisions, Murom serves as the administrative center of Muromsky District, even though it is not a part of it. As an administrative division, it is incorporated separately as the City of Murom—an administrative unit with the status equal to that of the districts. As a municipal division, the territory of the City of Murom together with nine rural localities in Muromsky District are incorporated as Murom Urban Okrug.

Sights

Murom still retains many marks of antiquity. The Savior monastery, one of the most ancient in Russia, was first chronicled in 1096, when Oleg of Chernigov besieged it and killed Vladimir Monomakh's son Izyaslav, who is buried there. In 1552, the monastery was visited by Ivan the Terrible who commissioned a stone cathedral, which was followed by other churches.

The Trinity convent, where the relics of Sts. Peter and Fevronia are displayed, features a fine cathedral (1642–1643), Kazan church (1652), a bell-tower (1652), a wooden church of St. Sergius, and stone walls. It is rivaled by the Annunciation Monastery, founded in the reign of Ivan the Terrible to house the relics of local princes and containing a cathedral from 1664. Two last-mentioned cathedrals, being probably the works of the same masters, have much in common with the Resurrection Church (1658) in the downtown. Quite different is the tent-like church of Sts. Cosmas and Damian, built in 1565 on the bank of the Oka to commemorate the Russian conquest of Kazan.

International relations

Twin towns — Sister cities
Murom is twinned with:

  Most, Czech Republic
  Babruysk, Belarus

Notable people
Among notable natives are the father of color photography, Sergey Prokudin-Gorsky (1863), the painter Ivan Kulikov(1875) and the father of television, Vladimir Zworykin (1888) and Russian physicist Igor Irodov.

References

Notes

Sources

Golden Ring of Russia
Cities and towns in Vladimir Oblast
Muromsky Uyezd